Brownville Junction is a census-designated place (CDP) in the town of Brownville, Piscataquis County, Maine, United States. It is west-central part of the town, on the west side of the Pleasant River, a south-flowing tributary of the Piscataquis River and part of the Penobscot River watershed.

The community came into existence in 1889 when the Canadian Pacific Railway built the International Railway of Maine as part of its transcontinental railroad, connecting Montreal, Quebec, with Saint John, New Brunswick. The railway crossed the older Bangor and Katahdin Iron Works Railway at the location that became the village. The rail lines are currently owned by the Canadian Pacific after a period of different ownership.

Brownville Junction was first listed as a CDP prior to the 2020 census.

Demographics

References 

Census-designated places in Piscataquis County, Maine
Census-designated places in Maine